Mobarak, also rendered as Mubarak, in Iran may refer to:
 Mobarak, Isfahan
 Mobarak, Bafq, Yazd Province
 Mobarak, Taft, Yazd Province